Hassen Harbaoui (born 3 October 1987) is a retired Tunisian football striker.

References

1987 births
Living people
Tunisian footballers
CA Bizertin players
CS Hammam-Lif players
Espérance Sportive de Tunis players
CS Sfaxien players
Olympique Béja players
US Ben Guerdane players
Association football forwards
Tunisian Ligue Professionnelle 1 players